(born October 14, 1950 in Kobe, Japan) is a jazz musician and performer, most known for his contributions to the soundtracks of the Lupin III anime series. He was born as Cheui Gwongsing (徐光星; Mandarin: Xu Guangxing; Japanese: Jo Kōsei). He also contributed his voice to the English-language song Que Sera Sera in the PlayStation 2 videogame Katamari Damacy and performed the Japanese translation of Secret Agent Man. He is also performing for the opening theme 『下弦の月』 (Kagen no tsuki, waning moon) of the anime series Mononoke.

He is also known in English as "Charlie Corsey".

External links
Official Site @ charlie-kosei.com (In Japanese)

1950 births
Living people
Japanese jazz musicians
Japanese people of American descent
Japanese people of Chinese descent
Lupin the Third
Musicians from Kobe
Anime musicians